Upper Gwynedd Township is a township in Montgomery County, Pennsylvania. The population was 15,552 at the time of the 2010 census. North Wales Borough is surrounded by Upper Gwynedd Township on all sides, and many homes and businesses with North Wales addresses are actually in Upper Gwynedd. Many properties with Lansdale addresses are in Upper Gwynedd as well. It is part of the North Penn Valley region that is centered around the borough of Lansdale.

Station Square, one of the first new transit oriented developments in the Delaware Valley, is located in Upper Gwynedd on the border with Lansdale. It is across the street from Pennbrook Station with SEPTA rail service to Philadelphia.

Geography
According to the U.S. Census Bureau, the township has a total area of 8.1 square miles (21.1 km2), all land. It is in the Schuylkill watershed and is drained by the Towamencin and Wissahickon Creeks. Its villages include Gwynedd Heights, Gwynedd Square, and West Point.

Neighboring municipalities
Lansdale (north)
Montgomery Township (east)
Lower Gwynedd Township (southeast)
Whitpain Township (south)
Worcester Township (west)
Towamencin Township (northwest)

Upper Gwynedd Township surrounds the borough of North Wales.

Demographics

As of the 2010 census, the township was 81.1% White, 4.2% Black or African American, 12.3% Asian, and 1.5% were two or more races. 2.2% of the population were of Hispanic or Latino ancestry.

As of the census of 2000, there were 14,243 people, 5,341 households, and 4,005 families residing in the township. The population density was 1,750.4 people per square mile (675.6/km2). There were 5,496 housing units at an average density of 675.4/sq mi (260.7/km2). The racial makeup of the township was 86.77% White, 3.97% African American, 0.08% Native American, 7.84% Asian, 0.41% from other races, and 0.94% from two or more races. Hispanic or Latino of any race were 1.45% of the population.

There were 5,341 households, out of which 33.7% had children under the age of 18 living with them, 65.3% were married couples living together, 7.6% had a female householder with no husband present, and 25.0% were non-families. 21.2% of all households were made up of individuals, and 7.2% had someone living alone who was 65 years of age or older. The average household size was 2.63 and the average family size was 3.08.

In the township, the population was spread out, with 23.8% under the age of 18, 6.2% from 18 to 24, 29.2% from 25 to 44, 28.0% from 45 to 64, and 12.8% who were 65 years of age or older. The median age was 40 years. For every 100 females there were 92.0 males. For every 100 females age 18 and over, there were 88.3 males.

The median income for a household in the township was $71,078, and the median income for a family was $81,371. Males had a median income of $52,430 versus $37,729 for females. The per capita income for the township was $32,806. About 1.4% of families and 1.9% of the population were below the poverty line, including 1.7% of those under age 18 and 2.7% of those age 65 or over.

Transportation

The Pennsylvania Turnpike Northeast Extension (I-476) is the most prominent highway passing through Upper Gwynedd Township. However, the nearest interchange is in Towamencin Township. U.S. Route 202 is the most prominent highway providing local access, traversing the eastern edge of the township along the Dekalb Pike and a new parkway. U.S. Route 202 Business follows the old alignment of US 202 along the Dekalb Pike north of the new parkway's southern terminus. Pennsylvania Route 63 forms the township's northeastern border, while Pennsylvania Route 363 acts as the township's northwestern border.

SEPTA Regional Rail's Lansdale/Doylestown Line runs through Upper Gwynedd Township; however, there are no stations in the township. The nearest train station is North Wales station in North Wales, which is surrounded by the township.  SEPTA provides Suburban Bus service to Upper Gwynedd Township along Route 94, which runs between the Chestnut Hill section of Philadelphia and the Montgomery Mall, and Route 96, which runs between the Norristown Transportation Center in Norristown and Lansdale.

Government and politics

Commissioners
Upper Gwynedd Township elects five at-large commissioners to four-year terms.

Denise Hull, President
Katherine Carter, Vice President
Liz McNaney
Ruth Damsker
Martha Simelaro

Legislators
State Senator Maria Collett, 12th district, Democrat
State Representative Liz Hanbidge, 61st district, Democrat
US Representative Madeleine Dean, 4th district, Democrat

History

Gwynedd was founded in 1698 by Welsh Quakers. The township was then split into Lower Gwynedd and Upper Gwynedd in 1891. The name Gwynedd means "Fair Land" in Welsh.

The township is so named because it was originally settled largely by migrants from Gwynedd and other parts of North Wales in the 17th and 18th centuries. For several generations,  the main language used in the township was Welsh.

The Keefe-Mumbower Mill, Knipe-Johnson Farm, Knipe-Moore-Rupp Farm, and Isaac Kulp Farm are listed on the National Register of Historic Places.

References

External links

 Upper Gwynedd Township

Townships in Montgomery County, Pennsylvania
Townships in Pennsylvania